Western Front was an American band formed in 1985 in Portland, Oregon that consisted of Fred Cole on vocals and guitar, Kevin Conner on bass, and Jeff Evans on drums. Cole had been in the garage rock band The Lollipop Shoppe and the punk rock band The Rats, among others. Western Front still had some punk influence but was more inspired by country music. They released two singles on Cole's Whizeagle label, "Orygun" b/w "Clementine" and "Stampede" b/w "Looking Back At Me." On a third single, "Coming on Strong" b/w "Rather Be Your Lover," they backed up Cole's wife Toody, who had been in The Rats. By 1986, the band had broken up. Fred and Toody went on to form The Range Rats, and later Dead Moon.

References

Musical groups from Portland, Oregon
1985 establishments in Oregon
1986 disestablishments in Oregon
Musical groups established in 1985
Musical groups disestablished in 1986